Hongxing is a town situated in the Harbin prefecture of Heilongjiang, China. It is under the jurisdiction of Acheng District. It contains the Hongxing Reservoir.

Administrative divisions
The township-level division contains the following villages:

Zhenxing Village 	
Haixing Village	() 	
Haidong Village	() 	
Cixing Village 	
Beizhao Village	()

See also
List of township-level divisions of Heilongjiang

References

Township-level divisions of Heilongjiang